Igor Vladimirovich Filippov (born ) is a Russian male volleyball player. He is part of the Russia men's national volleyball team. He won the bronze medal at the 2015 European Games in Baku. On club level he plays for Belogorie.

See also
 Russia at the 2015 European Games

References

1991 births
Living people
Russian men's volleyball players
Volleyball players at the 2015 European Games
European Games medalists in volleyball
European Games bronze medalists for Russia
Place of birth missing (living people)
VC Zenit Saint Petersburg players
VC Belogorie players